Kanikkaran is a Dravidian language spoken by about 19,000 Kanikkar tribals in southern India. They dwell in forests and hills of Thiruvananthapuram and Kollam districts of Kerala, and Kanyakumari and Tirunelveli districts of Tamil Nadu. It is called malambhāsha, or "hill-language."

Phonology

Vowels 
Kanikkaran has 5 vowels, /a, e, i, o, u/. It demonstrates contrastive vowel length.

Consonants 

They use the phoneme /l̩/ occasionally.

Kanikkaran has transformed words in Malayalam starting with /a/ into /e/. añcu (5) becomes eñcu, ari (rice) becomes ei, arivāḷu (sickle) becomes erivāḷu, aluku (split reed) becomes elakku. It also adds a suffix -in or -n after all noun stems, except for nouns ending with -n in accusative.

Grammar 

The language cannot use personal terminations, similar to Old Malayalam. Example: pōvā (will not go) and vārā (will not come).

References

Dravidian languages
Endangered diaspora languages
Languages of Tamil Nadu
Languages of Kerala